Peter Anthony Ciavaglia (born July 15, 1969) is an American retired professional ice hockey center. After graduating from Nichols School in Buffalo in 1987, Peter was selected in that year's NHL Entry Draft by the Calgary Flames. Deciding to take the college route, he played four seasons at Harvard University, where he was part of the 1989 national championship team, and eventually played in five games in the National Hockey League with the Buffalo Sabres between 1991 and 1993. He spent most of his professional career, which lasted from 1991 to 2000, in the International Hockey League with the Detroit Vipers.

Awards and honors

Career statistics

Regular season and playoffs

International

References

External links

1969 births
Living people
American men's ice hockey centers
Buffalo Sabres players
Calgary Flames draft picks
Detroit Vipers players
Harvard Crimson men's ice hockey players
Ice hockey people from Buffalo, New York
Ice hockey players at the 1994 Winter Olympics
Leksands IF players
Olympic ice hockey players of the United States
Rochester Americans players
Sportspeople from Albany, New York
NCAA men's ice hockey national champions
AHCA Division I men's ice hockey All-Americans